Nacoleia amphicedalis is a species of moth of the family Crambidae described by Francis Walker in 1859. It is found in Australia (Queensland and New South Wales).

The wingspan is about 15 mm. Adults are white with brown markings, including broad brown wing margins.

References

Moths described in 1859
Nacoleia
Moths of Australia